Lagan is the second largest locality situated in Ljungby Municipality, Kronoberg County, Sweden, with 1,744 inhabitants in 2010. It is at an altitude of 139 meters (459 feet). It has got its name from the river Lagan, which passes nearby.

References 

Populated places in Kronoberg County
Populated places in Ljungby Municipality
Finnveden